Coated paper (also known as enamel paper, gloss paper, and thin paper) is paper that has been coated by a mixture of materials or a polymer to impart certain qualities to the paper, including weight, surface gloss, smoothness, or reduced ink absorbency. Various materials, including kaolinite, calcium carbonate, bentonite, and talc, can be used to coat paper for high-quality printing used in the packaging industry and in magazines. 

The chalk or china clay is bound to the paper with synthetic s, such as styrene-butadiene latexes and natural organic binders such as starch. The coating formulation may also contain chemical additives as dispersants, resins, or polyethylene to give water resistance and wet strength to the paper, or to protect against ultraviolet radiation.

Varieties

Machine-finished coated paper 

Machine-finished coated paper (MFC) has a basis weight of 48–80 g/m2. They have good surface properties, high print gloss and adequate sheet stiffness. MFC papers are made of 60–85% groundwood or TMP and 15–40% chemical pulp with a total pigment content of 20–30%. The paper can be soft nip calendered or supercalendered. These are often used in paperbacks.

Coated fine paper 

Coated fine paper or woodfree coated paper (WFC) are primarily produced for offset printing:

 Standard coated fine papers This paper quality is normally used for advertising materials, books, annual reports and high-quality catalogs. Grammage ranges from 90–170 g/m2 and ISO brightness between 80–96%. The fibre furnish consists of more than 90% chemical pulp. Total pigment content are in the range 30–45%, where calcium carbonate and clay are the most common.
 Low coat weight papers These paper grades have lower coat weights than the standard WFC (3–14 g/m2/side) and the grammage and pigment content are also generally lower, 55–135 g/m2 and 20–35% respectively.
 s Art papers are one of the highest-quality printing papers and are used for illustrated books, calendars and brochures. The grammage varies from 100 to 230 g/m2. These papergrades are triple coated with 20–40 g/m2/side and have matte or glossy finish. Higher qualities often contain cotton.

Plastic coatings
Plastic-coated paper includes types of paper coatings; polyethylene or polyolefin extrusion coating, silicone, and wax coating to make paper cups and photographic paper. Biopolymer coatings are available as more sustainable alternatives to common petrochemical coatings like LDPE (see plastic-coated paper) or mylar.

Others 

Printed papers commonly have a top coat of a protective polymer to seal the print, provide scuff resistance, and sometimes gloss.   Some coatings are processed by UV curing for stability.

A release liner is a paper (or film) sheet used to prevent a sticky surface from adhering. It is coated on one or both sides with a release agent.

Heat printed papers such as receipts are coated with a chemical mixture, which often contains estrogenic and carcinogenic poisons, such as BPA. It is possible to check whether a piece of paper is thermographically coated, as it will turn black from friction or heat. (see thermal paper)

Paper labels are often coated with adhesive (pressure sensitive of gummed) on one side and coated with printing or graphics on the other.

See also 
 Gloss Paper, is encrusted with smoothness
 Carbon paper
 Folding box board
 Inkjet paper
 Paperboard
 Paper machine
 Paper making
 Plastic-coated paper
 Solid bleached board
 Solid unbleached board
 Thermal paper
 Tracing paper
 White-lined chipboard
 Waxed paper

References

Further reading 
 Soroka, W, "Fundamentals of Packaging Technology", IoPP, 2002, 
 Yam, K. L., "Encyclopedia of Packaging Technology", John Wiley & Sons, 2009, 

 
Packaging materials
Paper
Papermaking
Chemical processes